Cassina de' Pecchi is a town and comune in the Metropolitan City of Milan, in Lombardy, northern Italy.  The comune is bounded by other communes of Cernusco sul Naviglio, Bussero, Gorgonzola, Melzo and Vignate.
Cassina de' Pecchi has received the recognition of "Sustainable city for girls and boys"
in 1999, concerning councils with less than 50000 inhabitants

Twin towns
Cassina de' Pecchi is twinned with:

  Élancourt, France, since 1997

References

Cities and towns in Lombardy